The 1971–72 SM-sarja season was the 41st season of the SM-sarja, the top level of ice hockey in Finland. 12 teams participated in the league, and Ilves Tampere won the championship.

First round

Second round

Final round

Qualification round

External links
 Season on hockeyarchives.info

Fin
Liiga seasons
1971–72 in Finnish ice hockey